Wang Wauk River, a perennial river of the Great Lakes system, is located in the Mid North Coast region of New South Wales, Australia.

Course and features
Formed from the confluence of the Horse Creek and Teatree Creek, the Wang Wauk River rises on the slopes of the Meyers Range within Wang Wauk State Forest, and flows generally north and then east, joined by one minor tributary before reaching its confluence with the Coolongolook River, southwest of Nabiac. The river descends  over its  course.

See also

 Rivers of New South Wales
 List of rivers of Australia
 List of rivers of New South Wales (L–Z)

References

External links
 

Rivers of New South Wales
Mid North Coast
Mid-Coast Council